This is a list of butterfly species recorded in Estonia (excluded are the species not encountered during the past 100 years).

Hesperiidae – skippers
Dingy skipper - Erynnis tages
Grizzled skipper - Pyrgus malvae
Olive skipper - Pyrgus serratulae
Large grizzled skipper - Pyrgus alveus
Large chequered skipper - Heteropterus morpheus
Northern chequered skipper - Carterocephalus silvicola 
Chequered skipper - Carterocephalus palaemon
Essex skipper - Thymelicus lineola
Small skipper - Thymelicus sylvestris
Large skipper - Ochlodes sylvanus
Silver-spotted skipper - Hesperia comma

Papilionidae – swallowtails
Old World swallowtail - Papilio machaon
Scarce swallowtail - Iphiclides podalirius
Clouded Apollo - Parnassius mnemosyne

Pieridae – whites
Black-veined white - Aporia crataegi
Large white - Pieris brassicae
Small white - Pieris rapae
Green-veined white - Pieris napi
Bath white - Pontia daplidice
Wood white - Leptidea sinapis
Orange tip - Anthocharis cardamines
Brimstone - Gonepteryx rhamni
Moorland clouded yellow - Colias palaeno
Pale clouded yellow - Colias hyale
Clouded yellow - Colias crocea

Nymphalidae
White admiral - Limenitis camilla
Poplar admiral - Limenitis populi
Purple emperor - Apatura iris
Lesser purple emperor - Apatura ilia
European peacock - Aglais io
Small tortoiseshell - Aglais urticae
Red admiral - Vanessa atalanta
Painted lady - Vanessa cardui
Scarce tortoiseshell - Nymphalis xanthomelas
Large tortoiseshell - Nymphalis polychloros
Camberwell beauty - Nymphalis antiopa
False comma - Nymphalis vaualbum
Comma - Polygonia c-album
Map - Araschnia levana
Scarce fritillary - Euphydryas maturna
Marsh fritillary - Euphydryas aurinia
False heath fritillary - Melitaea diamina
Heath fritillary - Melitaea athalia
Nickerl's fritillary - Melitaea aurelia
Knapweed fritillary - Melitaea phoebe
Glanville fritillary - Melitaea cinxia
Spotted fritillary - Melitaea didyma
Dark green fritillary - Speyeria aglaja
Niobe fritillary - Fabriciana niobe
High brown fritillary - Fabriciana adippe
Silver-washed fritillary - Argynnis paphia
Cardinal - Argynnis pandora
Pallas's fritillary - Argynnis laodice
Lesser marbled fritillary - Brenthis ino
Queen of Spain fritillary - Issoria lathonia
Small pearl-bordered fritillary - Boloria selene
Pearl-bordered fritillary - Boloria euphrosyne
Frigga fritillary - Boloria frigga
Weaver's fritillary - Boloria dia
Titania's fritillary - Boloria titania
Freija fritillary - Boloria freija
Cranberry fritillary - Boloria aquilonaris
Bog fritillary - Boloria eunomia
Arran brown - Erebia ligea
Lapland ringlet - Erebia embla
Marbled white - Melanargia galathea
Baltic grayling - Oeneis jutta
Grayling - Hipparchia semele
Ringlet - Aphantopus hyperanthus
Speckled wood - Pararge aegeria
Northern wall brown - Lasiommata petropolitana
Large wall - Lasiommata maera
Woodland brown - Lopinga achine
Meadow brown - Maniola jurtina
Dusky meadow brown - Hyponephele lycaon
Scarce heath - Coenonympha hero
Coenonympha amyntas 
Pearly heath - Coenonympha arcania
Small heath - Coenonympha pamphilius
Large heath - Coenonympha tullia

Riodinidae - metalmarks
Duke of Burgundy - Hamearis lucina

Lycaenidae
Purple hairstreak - Thecla quercus
Brown hairstreak - Thecla betulae
Ilex hairstreak - Satyrium ilicis
White-letter hairstreak - Satyrium w-album
Black hairstreak - Satyrium pruni
Green hairstreak - Callophrys rubi
Scarce copper - Lycaena virgaureae
Sooty copper - Lycaena tityrus
Purple-shot copper - Lycaena alciphron
Small copper - Lycaena phlaeas
Large copper - Lycaena dispar
Purple-edged copper - Lycaena hippothoe
Short-tailed blue - Cupido argiades 
Small blue - Cupido minimus
Holly blue - Celastrina argiolus
Eastern baton blue - Pseudophilotes vicrama
Chequered blue - Scolitantides orion
Green-underside blue - Glaucopsyche alexis
Large blue - Phengaris arion
Idas blue - Plebejus idas
Silver-studded blue - Plebejus argus
Mountain argus - Aricia artaxerxes
Geranium argus - Eumedonia eumedon
Cranberry blue - Agriades optilete
Mazarine blue - Cyaniris semiargus
Common blue - Polyommatus icarus
Amanda's blue - Polyommatus amandus
Damon blue - Polyommatus damon
Adonis blue - Lysandra bellargus
Chalkhill blue - Lysandra coridon

See also
List of moths of Estonia
List of the butterflies of Saint Petersburg and Leningrad Oblast

External links
Estonian diurnal butterflies in the collections of the Museum of Zoology at Tartu University

References
J.Viidalepp et al. Eesti liblikad, Tallinn, 2000

Estonia
Estonia
Butterflies